{{Automatic taxobox
| taxon = Picochlorum
| authority = W.J.Henley et al., nom. illegit.
| subdivision_ranks = Species
| subdivision = 
Picochlorum atomus (Butcher) Henley, Hironaka, Guillou, M.Buchheim, J.Buchheim, M.Fawley & K.Fawley
Picochlorum maculatum (Butcher) Henley, Hironaka, Guillou, M.Buchheim, J.Buchheim, M.Fawley & K.Fawley
Picochlorum oklahomense Hironaka
Picochlorum celeri
| subdivision_ref = 
}}Picochlorum'' is a genus of green algae in the class Trebouxiophyceae. , AlgaeBase regarded the name as illegitimate.

It is a native marine microalga fit for cultivation at high growth rates, showing a 2 hour multiplying time in ideal conditions.

References

Trebouxiophyceae genera
Chlorellales
Enigmatic algae taxa